Joseph Richard may refer to:

Joseph-Adolphe Richard (1887–1964), Canadian politician
Joseph Henri Maurice Richard, Canadian ice hockey player

See also

Joseph Richards (disambiguation)